The 2nd FotoFilm Tijuana Festival took place from 27 to 31 July 2018, in Tijuana, Baja California, Mexico. The official selection included 14 feature films, including the Ariel Award winner for Best Picture Sueño en Otro Idioma; 12 short films produced by the Mexican Institute of Cinematography (IMCINE) and two produced by the Centro de Capacitación Cinematográfica (CCC); and for the competition section, six short films were the candidates for the "Best of Show" award, sent to the festival through an open call for filmmakers posted on the FilmFreeway website; Emma or the Incoveniences of a Suicide by Mexican director Marlon Morales won the award.

Official selection

Feature films

Source:

Short films

Desde Mexico
Also included as a part of the official selection of the festival was a section entitled "Desde Mexico", which included 10 short films produced by the Mexican Institute of Cinematography (IMCINE) and two produced by the Centro de Capacitación Cinematográfica (CCC).  Both, Oasis, directed by Alejandro Zuno, and Cerulia, directed by Sofía Carrillo, won the Ariel Award in 2018.

Jukebox Visual
The competition for the "Best of Show" award, was divided into animated, documentary, fiction and music video fields, and as an incentive for filmmakers from the Mexican states of Baja California, Baja California Sur, Chihuahua, Durango, Sinaloa, and Sonora a section entitled "Desde el Norte" ("From the North") was created. Six finalists were selected from all entries through the website Film Freeway. The Best of Show included a prize, equivalent to USD1,000, and was awarded to Emma or the Incoveniences of a Suicide by Mexican director Marlon Morales.

References

2018 film festivals
Culture in Tijuana
July 2018 events in Mexico
Events in Baja California